Dominic Tan Jun Jin; born 12 March 1997) is a Malaysian professional footballer who plays as a defender for Malaysia Super League club Sabah and the Malaysia national team.

Personal life
Tan who was born in Singapore to Malaysian parents from Penang, and he is a Singapore permanent resident, was in the National Football Academy before making the decision to take his boots across the causeway to Johor.

Club career 
Tan began his senior career playing in Malaysia, representing Harimau Muda C in the FAM League.

Johor Darul Ta'zim
In 2016, he signed with Johor Darul Ta'zim. He played with the second team in the Malaysia Premier League and then promoted to the main squad of for the Malaysia Super League and Malaysia Cup. He made his debut in a 3-0 away defeat against Perak in the 2018 Malaysia Cup.

On loan Vilaverdense F.C.

On 25 January 2018, Johor Darul Ta'zim have confirmed that Tan will leave for Portuguese third division club Vilaverdense on 27 January 2018 for a year-long loan stint. In early May, it was confirmed that Tan would return to Johor six months early alongside teammate Syamer Kutty Abba.

Police Tero

In 2019 Dominic joined Police Tero that plays in Thai League 2 on loan from Johor Darul Ta'zim. He made his first appearances with Police Tero B team in a match against Air Force United B in the 2019 Thai League 4. He made his debut in the 2019 Thai League 1 with Police Tero first team coming in as a substitute in the last minute against Air Force United. On 2020 season, Dominic sign a two year contract with Police Tero.

Sabah
In 2022 Dominic joined Sabah FC that plays in Malaysia Super League. He made his debut in the opening match of 2022 Malaysia Super League against Negeri Sembilan at the Likas Stadium. On 1 September 2022, he scored his first goal for Sabah in a 2-2 draw against Kuala Lumpur, which also his first goal in the first division of Malaysian League.

International career 

Dominic has represent the youth team of Singapore while living in Singapore as permanent residents. In August 2016, he received his first call-up for the national under-22 team and made his first start against Bahrain, with the match ending in a 0-0 draw. In 2017, he was selected for the Dubai Cup Football Tournament. In 2018, he played for the national under 23 team in the 2018 AFC U-23 Championship and 2018 Asian Games which Malaysia qualify into the knockout round. In June 2019, Dominic made his Malaysia debut after starting in the friendly match against Nepal.

Career statistics

Club

International

Honours

Club
Johor Darul Ta'zim
 Malaysia Super League: 2016, 2017
 Malaysia Cup: 2017

References

External links

Harimau Malaysia Official Website

Living people
1997 births
People from Penang
Malaysian sportspeople of Chinese descent
Malaysian footballers
Malaysia international footballers
Malaysia Super League players
Johor Darul Ta'zim F.C. players
Dominic Tan
Sabah F.C. (Malaysia) players
Dominic Tan
Association football central defenders
Malaysian expatriate footballers
People from Singapore
Singaporean emigrants to Malaysia
People who lost Singaporean citizenship
Citizens of Malaysia through descent
Footballers at the 2018 Asian Games
Asian Games competitors for Malaysia
Competitors at the 2019 Southeast Asian Games
Malaysian expatriate sportspeople in Thailand
Malaysia youth international footballers
Southeast Asian Games competitors for Malaysia